This is a list of notable contemporary Christian music artists from the 1970s.

The Encyclopedia of Contemporary Christian Music (2002) defines CCM as "music that appeals to self-identified fans of contemporary Christian music on account of a perceived connection to what they regard as Christianity". Based on this definition, this list includes artists that work in the Christian music industry as well as artists in the general market.

0-9
 2nd Chapter of Acts

A
 After the Fire (ATF)
 Dennis Agajanian
 All Saved Freak Band
 The Alpha Band
 The Archers

B
 a band called David
 Brown Bannister
 Bash-n-the-Code
 Bob Bennett
 Debby Boone
 Pat Boone
 Scott Wesley Brown
 Anita Bryant
 T Bone Burnett
 Wendell Burton

C
 Steve Camp
 Glen Campbell
 Ralph Carmichael
 Johnny Cash
 Chalice
 Children of the Day
 Chris Christian
 Paul Clark
 Terry Clark
 Cynthia Clawson
 Bruce Cockburn
 Denny Correll
 Andrae Crouch (and the Disciples)
 Andrew Culverwell

D
 Daniel Amos (a.k.a. DA and da)
 David and the Giants
 Mike Deasy
 DeGarmo and Key
 Dino
 Dion
 Jessy Dixon
 Phil Driscoll
 Roby Duke
 Bob Dylan

E
 Evie

F
 Don Francisco
 Aretha Franklin
 Richie Furay

G
 The Bill Gaither Trio
 Chuck Girard
 Glad
 Glass Harp
 Amy Grant
 Al Green
 Keith Green
 Peter Green
 Arlo Guthrie

H
 Danniebelle Hall
 Pam Mark Hall
 Larnelle Harris
 Harvest
 Edwin Hawkins (and the Edwin Hawkins Singers)
 Bryn Haworth
 Mark Heard
 Heritage Singers
 Annie Herring
 Benny Hester
 Dallas Holm
 Honeytree
 Jimmy Hotz
 Tom Howard
 Billie Hughes

I
 The Imperials

J
 Jerusalem
    JC Power Outlet (band)

K
 Tonio K.
 Kurt Kaiser
 Kansas
 Phil Keaggy
 Dave Kelly
 Debby Kerner

L
 Lazarus
 Liberation Suite
 Little Richard
 Love Song

M
 Malcolm and Alwyn
 Darrell Mansfield
 Randy Matthews
 Barry McGuire
 Sister Janet Mead
 Ken Medema
 David Meece
 Mighty Clouds of Joy
 Van Morrison
 Mustard Seed Faith
 Mylon and Holy Smoke

N
 Larry Norman

O
 Oak Ridge Boys
 Doug Oldham
 Michael and Stormie Omartian

P
 Leon Patillo
 Sandi Patty
 Gary S. Paxton
 Dan Peek
 Petra
 Andy Pratt
 Elvis Presley
 Billy Preston
   Pantano Salsbury

R
 Reba Rambo
 Ray Repp
 Resurrection Band (a.k.a. Rez Band)
 Cliff Richard
 Johnny Rivers
 Austin Roberts

S
 Seawind
 Shekina Glory
 Tim Sheppard
 B.W. Stevenson
 Randy Stonehill
 Noel Paul Stookey
 Sweet Comfort Band
   Ron Salsbury

T
 John Michael Talbot
 B.J. Thomas
 Truth
 Tim Sheppard

W
 Matthew Ward
 Wayne Watson
 The Way
 Kelly Willard
 Lanny Wolfe Trio
 Christine Wyrtzen

Notes

+Artists
Pop